Ingagi is a 1930 pre-Code mockumentary exploitation film directed by William S. Campbell. It purports to be a documentary about "Sir Hubert Winstead" of London on an expedition to the Belgian Congo, and depicts a tribe of gorilla-worshipping women encountered by the explorer. The film claims to show a ritual in which African women are given over to gorillas as sex slaves, but in actuality was mostly filmed in Los Angeles, using American actresses in place of natives. It was produced and distributed by Nat Spitzer's Congo Pictures, which had been formed expressly for this production. Although marketed under the pretense of being ethnographic, the premise was a fabrication, leading the Motion Picture Producers and Distributors Association to retract any involvement.

The film trades heavily on its nudity and on the suggestion of sex between a woman and a gorilla. Its success motivated RKO Radio Pictures to invest in the 1933 film, King Kong. RKO owned several of the theatres where Ingagi was shown, including one of the first, the Orpheum Theatre in San Francisco, where it opened April 5, 1930.

Production 
Much of the footage featured in the film was taken without permission from Grace Mackenzie's 1915 film Heart of Africa, which later resulted in legal action being brought against Congo Pictures by Mackenzie's son. The film purports to feature footage of a newly discovered animal, the "Tortadillo", however this animal was in fact a turtle with false wings and scales attached to it. The majority of the original footage was filmed at the Griffith Park Zoo.

The gorilla in the film is portrayed with a mixture of stock footage, much of which is actually footage of orangutans and chimpanzees, and actors in gorilla costumes. In October 1930, actor Charlie Gemora signed an affidavit swearing that he portrayed the gorilla. Actor Hilton Phillips, originally hired to play one of the African natives in the film, alleged that he also played the gorilla. Phillips later sued Congo Pictures, claiming they failed to pay him.

It was reported that Congo Pictures prepared versions of Ingagi dubbed in French, German, and Spanish. Sources have claimed that the word "ingagi" cannot be found "in any African language dictionary". "Ingagi" is in fact a Kinyarwanda word meaning "gorilla".

Release 
Following the film's release, multiple articles and reviews were published that were skeptical of the film's authenticity. In response, Congo Pictures filed a lawsuit against the MPPDA seeking $3,365,000 in damages, claiming that the MPPDA had "circulated reports doubting the authenticity of the film".

An investigation by the Federal Trade Commission concluded that the majority of the film was "false, fraudulent, deceptive and misleading", and ordered Congo Pictures to withdraw any advertising and material from the film proclaiming it to be genuine. As a result, the film was pulled from circulation. The Federal Trade Commission removed its sanction on the film in 1947.

Preservation
The film was never lost, contrary to popular belief due to it long being unavailable on home video or television. Three nitrate prints are held at The Library of Congress.

Seven of the eight Vitaphone discs have been found by fans and are now available on YouTube. 96 seconds of the film are included in the documentary Charlie Gemora: Uncredited.

In partnership with Something Weird Video, Kino Classics released a 4K restoration of the film on Blu-ray Disc on January 5, 2021.

Reception
From retrospective reviews, Michael Atkinson reviewed the home video release in Sight & Sound. Atkinson found the film "distinctive for portending to be something it absolutely is not", noting the film contained a litany of large animals killed and butchered while it had "wall to wall" supremacist stereotypes while finding the footage taken from other films as uproarious.

Follow-ups 
Congo Pictures followed Ingagi with an unsuccessful film titled Nu-Ma-Pu - Cannibalism in 1931, featuring much of the same crew. Like Ingagi, it purported to be a documentary, but was mostly fictitious.

The 1937 film Love Life of a Gorilla likely borrows footage from Ingagi, as contemporary plot descriptions mention a character named "Colonel Hubert Winstead".

The 1940 film Son of Ingagi, while not a sequel, is the first all-African-American horror film and features a house haunted by a female mad scientist and her missing link monster.

In 1947, Charlie Gemora announced his plans to direct and star in a jungle adventure movie that contemporary newspapers described as a sequel of Ingagi. However, the project never came to fruition.

See also
Congorilla, 1932 film

Notes

Sources
 
Berenstein, Rhona J. "White Heroines and Hearts of Darkness: Race, Gender and Disguise in 1930s Jungle Films", in Film History Vol. 6 No. 3 (Autumn 1994), Exploitation Films, pp. 314–339 (Published by Indiana University Press); Stable URL: https://www.jstor.org/stable/3814926

External links
 
 
Connection of the film to King Kong
  Alt URL
 

1930 adventure films
American black-and-white films
1930s English-language films
1930s exploitation films
Zoophilia in culture
Films set in Belgian Congo
History of racism in the cinema of the United States
Hoaxes in the United States
American adventure films
Films about gorillas
1930s American films